The Sanremo Music Festival 1963 was the 13th annual Sanremo Music Festival, held at the Sanremo Casino in Sanremo, province of Imperia between 7 and 9 February 1963.

The show was presented by Mike Bongiorno, assisted by Edy Campagnoli and Maria Giovannini. Gianni Ravera served as artistic director.
  
According to the rules of this edition every song was performed in a double performance by a couple of singers or groups. The winners of the Festival were Tony Renis and Emilio Pericoli with the song "Uno per tutte".

Participants and results

References 

Sanremo Music Festival by year
1963 in Italian music
1963 in music
1963 music festivals